Alexandrovo or Aleksandrovo may refer to:
Alexandrovo-Gaysky District, an administrative and municipal district (raion) in Saratov Oblast, Russia
Alexandrovo-Zavodsky District, an administrative and municipal district (raion) in Zabaykalsky Krai, Russia
Alexandrovo air base or Protasovo air base, an air base near Ryazan, Russia, disbanded 1992, now hosting the Ryazan Aeroclub